Schorbach is a small river of Hesse, Germany. It flows into the Grenff near Ottrau.

See also
 List of rivers of Hesse

Rivers of Hesse
Rivers of Germany